Fung Wan or The Storm Riders or Wind and Cloud may refer to

Fung Wan, a Manhua (Chinese comic) series by Ma Wing Shing
Adaptations of the comic series
Wind and Cloud, a Taiwanese TV series released in 2002
Wind and Cloud 2, a 2004 sequel to the 2002 TV series
The Storm Riders, a 1999 film
Storm Rider Clash of the Evils, a 2008 animated film
The Storm Warriors, a 2009 sequel to the 1999 film

See also
 Feng Yun (disambiguation)

Fung Wan